Isengops is an extinct genus of biarmosuchian therapsids from the Late Permian of Zambia. The type species is I. luangwensis.

References 

Burnetiamorphs
Prehistoric therapsid genera
Wuchiapingian genera
Lopingian synapsids of Africa
Fossils of Zambia
Fossil taxa described in 2021
Taxa named by Christian Sidor